Hermon is a town in St. Lawrence County, New York, United States. The population was 1,108 at the 2010 census. Hermon is named after Mount Hermon in Israel, which is the name corresponding to Mount Jabal al-Sheikh in Syria.
The town contains a hamlet also called Hermon, and is in the south-central part of the county, southwest of Canton.

History 
Settlement began around 1805.

The town was established in 1830 as the "Town of Depeau" from the towns of De Kalb and Edwards. The town's name was changed to Hermon–after a post office in the town–in 1834 due to the presence of another location named after Francis Depeau. In 1852, Hermon arrived at its current dimensions after a small part from its southeast corner  was moved to the town of Edwards.

The community of Hermon was set off from the town in 1887 by being incorporated as a village, which was dissolved in 2016.

Geography
According to the United States Census Bureau, the town has a total area of 54.2 square miles (140.4 km2), of which 53.4 square miles (138.4 km2) is land and 0.8 square miles (1.9 km2) (1.38%) is water.

Demographics

At the 2000 census, there were 1,069 people, 398 households and 284 families residing in the town. The racial make-up of the town was 98.22% white, .75% black or African American, .65% Asian, and .37% from two or more races. Hispanic or Latino of any race were .37% of the population.

There were 398 households, of which 35.2% had children under the age of 18 living with them, 52.3% were married couples living together, 10.6% had a female householder with no husband present, and 28.4% were non-families. 20.6% of all households were made up of individuals, and 9.3% had someone living alone who was 65 years of age or older. The average household size was 2.65 and the average family size was 3.04.

28.3% of the population were under the age of 18, 6.8% from 18 to 24, 25.6% from 25 to 44, 26.4% from 45 to 64, and 12.9% 65 years of age or older. The median age was 38 years. For every 100 females, there were 107.2 males. For every 100 females age 18 and over, there were 100.8 males.

The median household income was $34,500 and the median family income was $35,813. Males had a median income of $31,726 and females $22,813. The per capita income was $13,736. About 15% of families and 19.6% of the population were below the poverty line, including 28% of those under age 18 and 14.2% of those age 65 or over.

Communities and locations in Hermon 
Fairbanks Corners – a location at the eastern town line on County Road 21
Hermon – a hamlet in the northern part of the town on County Road 17, formerly a village
Kents Corners – a hamlet southwest of Hermon hamlet, located in the northeastern part of Hermon at the junction of County Roads 19 and 20.
Marshville – a hamlet south of Hermon hamlet. The name comes from Horatio Marsh, an early settler
Trout Lake – a lake in the southern part of the town

References

External links
  Early Hermon history

Towns in St. Lawrence County, New York